Vivian Baker is an American make-up artist. She won an Academy Award in the category Best Makeup and Hairstyling for the film Bombshell.

Selected filmography 
 Bombshell (2019; co-won with Kazu Hiro and Anne Morgan)

References

External links 

Living people
Year of birth missing (living people)
Place of birth missing (living people)
American make-up artists
Best Makeup Academy Award winners